The Buffalo State Bengals are composed of 18 teams representing Buffalo State College in intercollegiate athletics, including men and women's basketball, cross country, ice hockey, soccer, swimming & diving, and track and field. Men's sports include football. Women's sports include volleyball, lacrosse, and softball. The Bengals compete in the NCAA Division III and are members of the State University of New York Athletic Conference for most sports, except for the football team, which competes in the Liberty League.

Teams

Football

Former teams

Baseball
Buffalo State has had 6 Major League Baseball Draft selections since the draft began in 1965.

References

External links